G.T. International Tower is an office skyscraper located in Makati, Philippines. The "G.T." in the name stands for George Ty, the building's owner and chairman of the Metrobank Group. The building has 47 floors above ground, and 5 basement levels for parking.

On 29 January 2019, French urban climber Alain Robert climbed the building and was arrested upon finishing his descent.

Design and Construction
The G.T. International Tower was developed by Federal Land, Inc., the real estate arm of the Metrobank Group. The building's design was made by local architectural firms GF & Partners Architects and Gozar Planners Philippines, in cooperation with renowned international architectural firm Kohn Pedersen Fox Associates as its design consultant. Structural design was provided by Aromin & Sy + Associates, while the general contractor for the project was CIWIConstruction.

The tower is crowned with a 10-storey vertical fin. This fin marks its presence in the Makati skyline and provides a visual signature at the towers crown. Although the G.T. International Tower opened in 2001, it was not formally inaugurated until 2004.

Location
The building is located at the corner of Ayala Avenue and H.V. Dela Costa Street at Salcedo Village in Makati. It is also adjacent to the headquarters of BDO, a rival bank of Metrobank which is the main asset of the building's owner George Ty. It is situated near the entrance of the Makati Central Business District from Gil Puyat Avenue. It is a walking distance from most of Makati's other major office and residential buildings, including the second tallest building in the country, the PBCom Tower, and is easily accessible by public transport along Ayala Avenue.

See also 
 List of tallest buildings in the Philippines

References

External links
G.T. International Tower at Emporis
G.T. International Tower at Skyscraperpage.com
Location Map of G.T. International Tower at Ayala Maps website

Skyscrapers in Makati
Skyscraper office buildings in Metro Manila
Makati Central Business District
Office buildings completed in 2001
Kohn Pedersen Fox buildings